Bhagavatī (Devanagari: भगवती, IAST: Bhagavatī), is a Hindu epithet of Sanskrit origin, used as an honorific title for female deities in Hinduism. It is primarily used to address one of the Tridevi: Saraswati, Lakshmi, and Parvati.

The male equivalent of Bhagavatī is Bhagavān. The term is an equivalent of Devi and Ishvari.

Bhagavati Temples

India

Bhagavati temples can also be found all over Mumbai, for example,

 Bhagavati Devi Sansthan Deosari, Umarkhed, Yavatmal District, Maharashtra.
 Bhagavati temple at Ratnagiri, Maharashtra.
 Bhagawati Temple at Reotipur, Uttar Pradesh.
 Bhagawati Temple at Mirzapur, Uttar Pradesh.

Karnataka 
Bagavathi temple Sasihitlu Mangalore.
Famous temple in Karnataka on the bank of Arabian sea.
Guliga is the main Daiva here.
Bhagavathi temple in Ullal, Mangalore

Kerala

Shrines of these goddesses are referred to as Bhagavati Kshetram in Kerala. Some popular Bhagavati temples in Kerala are,
 Attukal Temple
 Kalluvettu Kuzhikkal Bhagavati Kshetram at Karaparamba, Calicut
Chakkulathukavu Temple
 Chottanikkara Temple
 Chettikulangara Devi Temple
 Madayi Kavu
 Kodungallur Bhagavathy Temple
 Paramekkavu Bhagavathi Temple, Thrissur
 Sankarankulangara Bhagavathi Temple, Thrissur
 Olarikkara Bhagavathi Temple, Thrissur
 Sree Kattukulangara Bagavathy Temple, Mampad, Palakkad
 Meenkulathi Bagavathy Temple, Pallasena, Palakkad
 Peroor Kavu Bhagavathi
 Kadampuzha Devi Temple
 Pisharikavu
 Kavaserry Bhagavathi Temple
 Mangottu Bhagavathi Temple
 Mondaicaud Bhagavathi Temple in Kolachal, Kanyakumari district, Tamil Nadu
 Lokanarkavu (Lokamalayar kavu) temple in Vatakara, Kozhikode District
 Kalayamvelli temple, Kozhikode District
 Uthralikkavu Bhagavati Temple, Thrissur District
 Shree Sasihithulu Bhagavathee Temple, Haleyangadi, Karnataka
 Kuttiyankavu temple, Minalur, Athani, Thrissur District
 Thechikkotukavu temple, Peramangalam, Thrissur District
 Thachanaathukaavu temple, Parlikad, Wadakanchery, Trichur District
 Tiruvaanikkaavu bhagawati temple, Machaad, Wadakanchery, Trichur District
 Tirumandaamkunnu temple, Angaadipuram, Perinthalmana, Malappuram
 Kottuvally Kavu Bhagavathy temple, Koonammavu, Ernakulam
 Sree Emur Bhagavathy Hemambika temple (http://www.sreeemoorbhagavathy.org/about.php), Kallekulangara, Palakkad

Goa

Many Bhagavati temples are found in Goa, where the deity is mainly worshiped in the form of Mahishasuramardini by the Goud Saraswat Brahmin, Daivadnya Brahmin, Bhandari communities. Bhagavati is also worshiped as one of the Panchayatana deity in most of the Goan temples. Shrines specially dedicated to Bhagavati are:

Bhagavati (Pernem)
Bhagavati Haldonknarin (Khandola, Goa)
Bhagavati Chimulakarin (Marcela, Goa)
Bhagavati (Parse, Goa)
Bhagavati (Mulgao, Goa)

Nepal 

 Shobha Bhagawati(शोभा भगवती मन्दिर), Kathmandu
 Naxal Bhagawati Temple, Kathmandu
 Chinnamasta Bhagawati Temple, Saptari District, Nepal
 Palanchok Bhagawati Temple, Kavrepalanchok District
 Kalinchowk Bhagwati Temple, Kalinchowk Rural Municipality
 Bhagwati Bahal Temple (भगवती बाहल मन्दिर), Thamel, Kathmandu
 Bindhyabasini Temple, Pokhara
Argha Bhagwati temple, Arghakhanchi District
 Taleju, Hanumand Dhokha, Kathmandu
 Taleju, Patan
 Taleju, Bhaktapur
 Bhadrakali
 Palpa Bhagawati

See also
 Ishvari
 Bhagavan
 Devi

References

External links

Hindu goddesses
Hinduism in Kerala
Hinduism in Goa
Shaktism
 Bhagavathi